The 1912–13 Georgia Bulldogs basketball team represents the University of Georgia during the 1912–13 college men's basketball season. The team captain of the 1912–13 season was D.W. Johnston.

Schedule

|-

References

Georgia Bulldogs basketball seasons
Georgia
Bulldogs
Bulldogs